The Playoff Bowl (officially, the Bert Bell Benefit Bowl) was a post-season game for third place in the NFL, played ten times following the 1960-69 seasons. It was abandoned in favor of the current playoff structure with the AFL-NFL merger in 1970. The following is a list of the television networks and announcers that broadcast the Playoff Bowl during its existence.

References

External links
The Playoff Bowl (Bert Bell Benefit Bowl)

Lists of National Football League announcers
National Football League playoffs
CBS Sports
CBS Sports Spectacular
Broadcasters
20th century-related lists
Florida sports-related lists